"Anita G." is a short story written by Alexander Kluge in 1962, which was adapted into the film Yesterday Girl in 1966.

References

1962 short stories
German short stories
Short stories adapted into films
Works by Alexander Kluge